Borșa is a commune in Cluj County, Transylvania, Romania. It is composed of five villages: Borșa, Borșa-Cătun (Bánffytanya), Borșa-Crestaia, Ciumăfaia (Csomafája) and Giula (Kolozsgyula).

Demographics 
According to the census from 2002 there was a total population of 1,865 people living in this commune. Of this population, 88.47% are ethnic Romanians, 8.79% are ethnic Hungarians and 2.68% ethnic Romani.

References 

Communes in Cluj County
Localities in Transylvania